KXDJ (98.3 FM) is an American radio station broadcasting a country music format. It is licensed to Spearman, Texas, United States, and serves the Amarillo area. The station is owned by Chris Samples.

External links

XDJ
Country radio stations in the United States
Radio stations established in 1963
1963 establishments in Texas